Heroes was a South Korean variety show; a part of SBS's Good Sunday lineup, along with Running Man. It is classified as a "popularity search variety", where the female celebrities compete to find out which of them is more popular among citizens. It was first aired on July 18, 2010 and ended on May 1, 2011 with a total of 40 episodes aired. Each week, the celebrities are divided into two equal groups of a "Popular" group and an "Unpopular" group (or "Not-So-Popular" group) and must complete certain missions every episode and whoever wins usually get a prize, such as the other team must make dinner for them, they get a hot shower and beds, etc.

Cast 
Hosts
 Noh Hong-chul
 Lee Hwi-jae

 Main cast
 Noh Sa-yeon
 Park Ji-yeon
 Seo In-young
 Kahi
 Hong Soo-ah
 Lee Jin
 Shin Bong-sun
 IU
 Yoo In-na
 Nicole Jung
 Narsha
 Jeong Ga-eun

Awards & nominations

References

External links 
  Heroes on the Official Good Sunday homepage
  Watch Heroes on the Official Good Sunday YouTube channel

2010 South Korean television series debuts
2011 South Korean television series endings
Seoul Broadcasting System original programming
South Korean reality television series
South Korean variety television shows